Dashnor Sula (14 March 1969) is a member of the Assembly of the Republic of Albania for the Democratic Party of Albania. He started his political career in 2005 when he won the elections and became the deputy of Peqin city.

Early life and family 
Dashnor Sula was born in Peqin, on 14 march 1969 to Riza Sula and Refije Sula. He was raised in Peqin and continued his studies there until he finished high school. Afterwards he moved to Tirana to continue his studies. He did his Bachelor studies in Law at the University of Tirana and his Master studies in Criminal Law. 

He has been married to Elida Magani Sula since 1994 and they have two children, Paola Sula and Silvio Sula.

Career 

 1992-1993: Attorney at the prosecutor's office of Peqin 
 1993-1996: Attorney at the prosecutor's office of Elbasan 
 1996-1998: Attorney at the prosecutor's office of Tirana 
 1998-1998: Attorney at the prosecutor's office of Gjirokaster 
 1999-2000: Attorney at the general prosecutor's office; Supreme court.  
 2002-2005: Attorney at the general prosecutor's office regarding organized crimes. 
 2005-2013: Member of Albanian Parliament.
 2020-present: Member of Albanian Parliament.

Other works 
Dashnor Sula has also taken the lawyer licence and he still continues to practice his profession.

References

People from Peqin
Democratic Party of Albania politicians
Members of the Parliament of Albania
21st-century Albanian politicians
Living people
1969 births